Ralli may refer to:

People
Rallis or Ralli, a surname, including a list of people with the name
Ralli Ben-Yehuda (born 1934), Israeli Olympic gymnast
Théodore Ralli (1852-1909), Greek artist

Other uses
Ralli car, a type of horse-drawn cart
Ralli Hall, a venue in Hove, England
Ralli Museum (Caesarea), two art museums (Ralli 1 and Ralli 2) in Caesarea, Israel
Ralli quilt, traditional quilts from Sindh, Pakistan and western India
Ralli (suborder), a suborder of the bird order Gruiformes
Spermophilus ralli, a squirrel of family Sciuridae

See also
Rally (disambiguation)